Come Closer With... Kewei is Tay Kewei's debut label album, released on September 8, 2010.

Track listing

References

External links 
 https://web.archive.org/web/20120611043939/http://www.taykewei.com/info/#/about-kewei/discography-2/

2010 albums
Tay Kewei albums